Swain Reefs is a national park in North Queensland, Australia,  north of Brisbane. It was established in 1995, and covers an area of 0.58 km2. It is managed by the Queensland Parks and Wildlife Service.

Fauna

Birds
Other birds recorded on the cays include masked and brown boobies, silver gulls, black-naped, sooty, bridled, greater crested, lesser crested and little terns, black and common noddies, and lesser frigatebirds. Cays supporting seabirds include Gannet Cay, Bylund Cay, Thomas Cay, Bacchi Cay, Frigate Cay, Price Cay, Distant Cay, Riptide Cay and Bell Cay.

Fish

See also

 Protected areas of Queensland

References

External links
 Swains Reef

National parks of Queensland
Protected areas established in 1995
1995 establishments in Australia
Important Bird Areas of Queensland
Islands on the Great Barrier Reef